Elżbieta Nowak (born 2 September 1972) is a Polish former basketball player who competed in the 2000 Summer Olympics.

References

1972 births
Living people
Polish women's basketball players
Olympic basketball players of Poland
Basketball players at the 2000 Summer Olympics
People from Jelenia Góra
Sportspeople from Lower Silesian Voivodeship